The Social Action Party was a political party in Thailand.

History 
The Social Action Party was formed by the more liberal members of the Democrat Party in 1974 under the leadership of Kukrit Pramoj. After Kukrit resigned the office of the party leader in December 1985, the former minister of foreign affairs and deputy party leader, Siddhi Savetsila, led the party.

Internal conflict during the 1986 parliamentary election resulted in a significant loss for the party. Controversy arose as rumor spread that General Arthit Kamlang-ek was secretly backing the party. By May 1986, with financial support from big businesses, a faction of the party split off with Boontheng Thongsawasdi to form the United Democracy Party, which proved to be unsuccessful.

Corruption scandals continued to devastate the party. In the fall of 1990, when Prime Minister Chatichai Choonhavan threatened to expel the party from his government coalition, founder Kukrit was asked to return briefly to replace Siddhi Savetsila. Partly because Chatichai had previously served Kukrit as foreign minister, Chatichai ultimately decided not to expel the party.

In December 1990, along with the Democratic Party, the Social Action Party withdrew entirely from Chatichai's government coalition, though it later rejoined Suchinda Kraprayoon's government in April 1992. It left the pro-military coaliliton in June 1992.

After splitting into two factions as a result of a power struggle in 1999, the party once again withdrew from the government led by Prime Minister Chuan Leekpai, with 17 Parliament members withdrawing from the ruling coalition. In 2000, many of the members, including former leader Suwit Khunkitti, left Social Action for the Thai Rak Thai party.

2001–2018
By the year 2001, the Social Action Party had lost much of the political support it had back in the 1970s. The 2001 election resulted in the party winning only one seat in parliament. In 2003, the party was disbanded. The party was revived in 2008 as Suwit returned. He was a member of the Cabinet of Thailand under Prime Minister Abhisit Vejjajiva's coalition government. In the 2011 Thai general election, the Social Action Party won 0.3% of party-list votes and no seats. The Social Action Party was dissolved in 2018 due to an order of the Election Commission of Thailand.

Ideology
The Social Action Party advocated pro-free-enterprise fiscal policies.

Chairmen
 Mom Rajawongse Kukrit Pramoj (1974–1985)
 Air Chief Marshal Siddhi Savetsila (1985–1990)
 M.R. Kukrit Pramoj (again, shortly in 1990)
 Montri Pongpanich (1990–1998)
 Boonphan Kaewattana (1998–1999)
 Suwit Khunkitti (1999–2000)
Payung Nopsuwan (2000–2003)
Jetsada Tantibunchachai (2003–2004)
Attapol Chainansmith (2004–2007)
Tongpool Deepai (2008–2018)

General election results

References

Defunct political parties in Thailand
Political parties established in 1974
1974 establishments in Thailand
Conservative parties in Thailand
Liberal conservative parties
2018 disestablishments in Thailand
Political parties disestablished in 2018